Christopher John Pappas (born 26 August 1991) is a South African politician who is the mayor of the uMngeni Local Municipality. A member of the Democratic Alliance, he has been the party's deputy provincial leader since 2021. Pappas served as a member of the eThekwini city council from 2016 until 2019 and as a DA Member of the KwaZulu-Natal Legislature  from 2019 to 2021.

Early life and education
Pappas is from Mooi River and has a sister. He attended Treverton Preparatory School and College and then Hilton College, matriculating in 2009. While studying Town and Regional Planning at the University of Pretoria, he was approached by COPE to run for the student representative council under their banner. He agreed and was then elected to the university's SRC. Pappas served as the temporary president of the student body at one stage. After graduating in 2013, he pursued a Master of Public Administration in Local Government Management at Walden University.

Career
Before going into politics, Pappas worked as a development economist for Urban-Econ. Having joined the Democratic Alliance, he was the party's campaign manager in KwaZulu-Natal for the 2014 general election.

He was elected as the ward councillor for ward 31 in the eThekwini Metropolitan Municipality in 2016.  In August 2018, he was criticised for calling the city "dirty and dangerous".

Pappas was elected to the KwaZulu-Natal Legislature in the May 2019 provincial election. He was then appointed as the DA's spokesperson on agriculture.

In January 2021, Pappas was made the party's spokesperson on Cooperative Governance and Traditional Affairs, replacing Mbali Ntuli. On 27 March 2021, he was elected as the Deputy Provincial Leader of the Democratic Alliance in KwaZulu-Natal, defeating Hlengiwe Shozi and Samier Singh.

Mayor of uMngeni 
On 11 September 2021, Pappas was announced as the DA's mayoral candidate for the uMngeni Local Municipality ahead of the local government election in November 2021. uMngeni became the first DA majority municipality in KZN, which was accredited to Pappas' "spirited campaign".

On 12 November 2021, the suspended ANC municipal manager Thembeka Cibane tried to preside over the inaugural council meeting. The DA objected to her presiding over the meeting at the Howick-West community hall and refused to participate as it would be illegal. The DA subsequently walked out of the meeting. Pappas and other DA councillors were sworn in at the Howick Magistrate's court later that day. On 17 November, the DA filed court papers to compel the acting municipal manager, Sandile Buthelezi, to call a first council meeting for the municipality's leadership to be elected. The Pietermaritzburg High Court ruled in favour of the DA and ordered Buthelezi to convene a council meeting. On 22 November 2021, Pappas was elected as mayor, becoming the first DA mayor in KwaZulu-Natal. He is the first openly gay man to be elected mayor in the country and across Africa.

In January 2023, Pappas announced that he would be standing down as deputy provincial leader of the DA at the party's provincial conference in April.

Personal life
Pappas is openly gay. He is engaged to JP Prinsloo, a former DA councillor from eThekwini. He speaks isiZulu and English fluently.

References

External links

Hon. CJ Pappas – KZN Legislature

Living people
1991 births
Alumni of Hilton College (South Africa)
Democratic Alliance (South Africa) politicians
Development economists
Gay politicians
LGBT mayors
South African LGBT politicians
Mayors of places in South Africa
Members of the KwaZulu-Natal Legislature
People from Mpofana Local Municipality
South African people of Greek descent
University of Pretoria alumni
Walden University alumni
White South African people